Said Al-Sobakhi (born 20 June 1985) is a Palestinian footballer who plays his club football for Wadi Al-Nes. He plays primarily as a striker, although he can be deployed as an attacking midfielder.

Club career
In October 2008, Al-Sobakhi moved from his Gaza-based club Khadamat Rafah to West Bank Premier League club Wadi Al-Nes. His first season proved to a very successful one, his 17 league goals meant placed him second in the scorers charts and helped earn Wadi Al-Nes the league title.

International career
Al-Sobakhi made his national team debut for Palestine during the 2008 WAFF Championship. During 2010 AFC Challenge Cup qualifying, Al-Sobakhi made his first start for the national team where he scored his first goal in a 1–1 draw with Kyrgyzstan.

International goals
Scores and results list Palestine's goal tally first.

References

External links

1985 births
Living people
People from Rafah Governorate
Palestinian footballers
Palestine international footballers
Taraji Wadi Al-Nes players
West Bank Premier League players
Footballers at the 2006 Asian Games
Association football forwards
Asian Games competitors for Palestine